Royale Union Tubize-Braine, also known as Tubize-Braine or RUTB, is a Belgian football club based in the cities of Tubize and Braine-le-Comte. 

The club was founded in 1990 as the result of a merger of two clubs, F.C. Tubize and Amis Réunis de Tubize. At that point it was known as AFC Tubize and last promoted to the first division in 2008, relegating back in 2009. In 2021, the club merged with neighboring Stade Braine from Braine-le-Comte, to form Tubize-Braine, which involved a new logo and a change of colors, from blood red and gold to white and gold.

Current squad
As of 30 January, 2022:

Out on loan

Staff
As of 6 July 2017:

References

External links
 Official Website 
 AFC Tubize at UEFA.COM

 
Association football clubs established in 1953
Football clubs in Belgium
Sport in Tubize
Belgian Pro League clubs
1953 establishments in Belgium